The 1949 Pacific Tigers football team was an American football team that represented the College of the Pacific—now known as the University of the Pacific—in Stockton, California as an independent during the 1949 college football season. In their third season under head coach Larry Siemering, the Tigers compiled an undefeated 11–0 record, were ranked No. 10 in the final AP Poll, and outscored all opponents by a combined total of 575 to 66. The Tigers' victories included a 34–7 besting of Cincinnati, a 62–14 victory over San Diego State, and a 45–6 victory over Utah.

Quarterback Eddie LeBaron was selected by both the Associated Press and International News Service as a first-team player on the 1949 All-Pacific Coast football team.

Schedule

Team players in the NFL
The following Pacific Tigers were selected in the 1950 NFL Draft.

References

Pacific
Pacific Tigers football seasons
College football undefeated seasons
Pacific Tigers football